Charles in Charge is an American sitcom television series that premiered on October 3, 1984, on CBS. The series was a production of Al Burton Productions and Scholastic Productions in association with Universal Television and starred Scott Baio, who had previously starred in Happy Days, in the title role. Willie Aames, who had previously been a cast member on Eight Is Enough, also starred as Charles’ best friend Buddy Lembeck.  

Charles in Charge joined the CBS Wednesday night lineup at 8:00 pm, placing it against ABC’s hit action series The Fall Guy and the new Michael Landon-led Highway to Heaven on NBC. At the time, with the exception of their Monday-night comedies (Kate & Allie and Newhart), CBS's sitcom lineup was not performing well in the ratings and Charles in Charge did not do much to change that. Still, the network allowed the show to remain in production to complete the 22 episodes it had ordered for the season. 

After the February 27, 1985, episode, CBS placed Charles in Charge on hiatus. Two episodes had yet to air, and CBS aired them on March 13 and April 3, 1985. The network then dropped Charles in Charge from its Wednesday lineup in favor of the mystery drama series Double Dare; the show was moved to Saturday, where it aired in reruns for several weeks until it was replaced by the drama Cover Up. None of these series were renewed for a second season, nor were either of the two comedies that shared the hour with Charles in Charge (Dreams and E/R).

One year later, after seeing the success of some cancelled network series after they were revived for first-run syndication (which was a significant trend at the time), Universal decided to rework and relaunch Charles in Charge in syndication. The show premiered on local stations at the midway point of the 1986-87 season, with the first episode of the new series premiering on January 3, 1987. Four seasons were produced for syndication, with the last episode airing on November 10, 1990. In total, 126 episodes were produced, 22 in the abbreviated first season and 26 in each of the syndicated seasons.

Premise
The series takes place in New Brunswick, New Jersey. Charles, whose last name is never revealed, is a student at Copeland College (fictional, perhaps meant to represent Rutgers University, whose main campus is in New Brunswick) and is 19 years old when the series begins.

First season
Needing a place to live while attending school, Charles applies for a job working for Stan and Jill Pembroke, an affluent couple in search of a live-in housekeeper. An arrangement is reached where Charles would take the job with the Pembrokes while he attended Copeland, and in lieu of a salary, he would receive room and board for his duties as caretaker for their children Jason, Douglas, and Lila, all three of whom are not much younger than he is. In addition to this, as well as his escapades with his best friend Buddy, Charles has a crush on fellow Copeland student Gwendolyn Pierce and spends quite a bit of his free time trying to court her, which never seems to work.

Syndication changes
When the show returned in 1987, only Scott Baio and Willie Aames returned from the original cast, as the producers reworked the story to accommodate the changes in cast. 

The second season's first episode featured Charles returning to New Brunswick from his summer vacation, only to discover an unfamiliar family living in the Pembrokes' home. He learns that the Pembrokes left New Jersey while he was away and have moved across the country to Seattle. The new family, the Powells, agreed to sublet the house from the Pembrokes, which included retaining Charles' services as live-in babysitter. 

The Powell clan consisted of mother Ellen and grandfather Walter, who was Ellen's husband's widowed father and who was living with them to fulfill his son's role as he served overseas in the U.S. Navy. Like the Pembrokes, the Powells also had three children, daughters Jamie and Sarah and younger brother Adam. 

Charles' previously unseen widowed mother Lillian became a central character in the revival series. She was played by Ellen Travolta, which marked the second time that she had played mother to a character portrayed by Baio; she had done the same thing on Joanie Loves Chachi several years earlier (although she first played cousin Jimmy Baio’s mother on a 1978 episode of “The Love Boat.”)

Cast

Michael Pearlman and Jennifer Runyon are the only other actors, besides Baio and Aames, to reprise their roles on the show after the first season.  Pearlman appeared in the second-season premiere, "Amityville". (Lisa Donovan played Jill Pembroke in that episode.) Runyon appeared in "Twice Upon a Time (Part 1)" and "Twice Upon a Time (Part 2)".

In the final two seasons, Sandra Kerns only made three more appearances (once in season 4 and twice in season 5). Baio and Aames are the only two cast members who appear in every single episode.

Theme song
The theme song was composed by David Kurtz, Michael Jacobs, and Al Burton, and performed by Shandi Sinnamon. The theme music was mellower in the first season, and was remixed for the syndication run.

The song was performed by the a cappella group The Blanks in the medical sitcom, Scrubs, and was featured on their 2004 album, Riding the Wave.

Episodes

Home release

DVDs
Universal Pictures released a three-disc set of the first season of Charles in Charge on DVD in North America on February 14, 2006. Due to poor sales, no further seasons were released.

In September 2007,  Arts Alliance America (which subsequently changed its name to Virgil Films & Entertainment during the summer of 2007) announced it had acquired the rights to the series. They subsequently released seasons 2–5 on DVD. Seasons 4 and 5 were Manufacture-on-Demand (MOD) releases, available exclusively through Amazon.com.

Streaming
All five seasons of the series were made available for streaming through Amazon Video and season one only on Hulu Plus. In addition, the entire series can be streamed on the NBC.com app.

Syndication reruns
When Charles in Charge returned to television, an arrangement had been made with stations owned by Tribune Broadcasting to carry the program in first run. Through this arrangement, the show was also able to gain nationwide carriage as its Chicago affiliate, WGN-TV, was a national cable superstation.

In 1988, with the series nearing the 100-episode mark, distributor MCA Television began advertising in trade publications that it would begin selling reruns of Charles in Charge to local stations for a fall 1989 launch. The show reached the mark when the 1988-89 season ended, and the show began airing daily in syndication shortly thereafter. After the final episode aired in 1990, the syndication package added them, as well; the package included the first 22 episodes that had aired on CBS and the 78 that had aired over the first three seasons in syndication.

References

External links
 
 
 Charles in Charge Online

1980s American sitcoms
1984 American television series debuts
1990 American television series endings
1990s American sitcoms
American television series revived after cancellation
CBS original programming
Television shows about child care occupations
English-language television shows
Fictional nannies
First-run syndicated television programs in the United States
Television series about families
Television series by Universal Television
Television series created by Michael Jacobs
Television shows set in New Jersey